Robbery Under Arms is a 1907 Australian film based on the popular 1888 novel. It was from the team of J and N Tait and Millard Johnson and W Gibson, who had just made The Story of the Kelly Gang. It is considered a lost film.

Another film based on the same the book came out the same year, which was filmed in Sydney. This has led to some confusion as to whether the Tait-Johnson-Gibson film even existed.

Plot
According to a contemporary newspaper report, "All the incidents of the romantic bushranger Starlight are enacted, from the first incident, the branding of stolen cattle, to the "Last stand of Starlight and the Marston boys."  An advertisement for the film, to be shown at the Oddfellows' Hall in Wagga Wagga on the 8th and 9th of January 1908, describes Robbery Under Arms as "The Greatest Series of Dramatic moving Pictures Ever Taken".  It details the major scenes in the film as "such well-known and famous incidents as – The First Downward Step, Captain Starlight Wounded by Police, The Cattle Sale, Terrible Hollow, The Runaway and Rescue, The Marstons at St. Kilda, Berrima Gaol, Sticking up the Goulburn Mail, Kate Morrison's Revenge, Robbing the Gold Escort, The Bushranger's Last Stand, and numerous other great and dramatic situations".

Production
The film was completed by October 1907. It was shot in Melbourne

References

External links
 Article on the two 1907 Robbery Under Arms films

1907 films
1907 Western (genre) films
1900s lost films
Australian black-and-white films
Films based on Robbery Under Arms
Lost Australian films
Lost Western (genre) films
Silent Australian Western (genre) films
Silent drama films
1900s English-language films